"I'll Give All My Love to You" is a song recorded by Keith Sweat from his studio album of the same name (1990). It was written and produced by Sweat and Bobby Wooten and released as the album's second single. The song reached number seven on the US Billboard Hot 100 and spent one week at number one on the US Billboard R&B chart. The song also is featured as a live version on "Sweat Hotel: Live" with R&B singer Monica.

Track listing

12" single
A1. I'll Give All My Love To You
B1. I'll Give All My Love To You (Love Mix)
B2. I Want Her (Dance Til Ya Sweat Mix)

CD single
I'll Give All My Love To You (Edit) (4:29)
I'll Give All My Love To You (LP Version) (5:36)

Charts

Weekly charts

Year-end charts

See also
List of number-one R&B singles of 1991 (U.S.)

References

1990s ballads
1990 singles
Keith Sweat songs
Contemporary R&B ballads
Songs written by Keith Sweat
1990 songs
Elektra Records singles